Yves Pépin is a creator of multimedia shows and large-scale events including the multi-awarded Eiffel Tower Millennium Show. In the course of his career, Pépin's projects have been honored with many awards; an outstanding personal honor was received in 2006, when his peers in the Themed Entertainment Association, the international association for creators of compelling places and experiences, presented him with the prestigious TEA Thea Award for a Lifetime of Distinguished Achievements.

Early life
A native of Bordeaux, France, Pépin pursued a specialist music education up to age 16. He later took a French postgraduate degree in economics and politics, and also received a French government bursary to attend a two-year, full-time education program at the Center for Research and Arabic Studies in Beirut. He worked as a French radio presenter and producer between 1968 and 1970 in Lebanon, Morocco and Paris.
From 1970 to 1974, he was project manager and group manager at Orel, a communications company located in Paris.
In 1974, he founded, along with Yves Devraine and Thierry Arnaud, the design and production company ECA2.

Leading ECA2
Under his direction, the company designed the logos for Concorde and Air France, among others, and produced the first interactive visuals for the Musée d'Orsay and the Louvre. After Yves Devraine and Thierry Arnaud departed the company, Pépin shifted its focus to the production of multimedia shows. In 1989 Pépin, a keen innovator, created and developed the process of Cinema on Water Screen (AQUASCAN®), a system subsequently adopted by Disney and Universal Studios, among others.

Yves Pépin has built a worldwide reputation as a designer and producer of ground-breaking multimedia entertainments for one-off, semi-permanent and permanent performance, including major world broadcast events as the Football World Cup 98 Ceremonies, the Millennium fireworks celebration show at the Eiffel Tower in 2000, advising for the Beijing 2008 Olympic Ceremonies, and producing several World Expo Night Shows.

Today 
Since 2008, Pépin has worked as an independent. In addition to his role as consultant for major companies and institutions, he is designing and directing multimedia shows, as for Akshardham Temple  in Gandhinagar and New Delhi (performed daily); and multimedia concerts such as "Lost in Space" with Jeff Mills and l’Orchestre National du Capitole de Toulouse in 2018.

Body of work
He has conceived and staged one-off productions for a host of landmark events, including:

Events

"Lost in Space" with Jeff Mills: Toulouse, France, 2018
Yeosu 2012 World Expo: consultant for "Big O" Night Show
Beijing 2008 Olympic Games: artistic consultant for Opening and Closing Ceremonies
New Lexus launch show, Tokyo, 2006
"Luz y Voces del Tajin," Mexico, 2003/2005
Aichi World Expo 2005 (Japan): "Movement is Life," Toyota Pavilion
Athens 2004 Paralympic Games: Opening and Closing Ceremonies 
Abuja, African Games (Nigeria, 2003): Opening and Closing Ceremonies
Neuchâtel, National Swiss Expo 2002: Palais de l’Equilibre Permanent Show
Yamaguchi Japan Expo 2001: Night Show
2000 Eiffel Tower Millennium Show (Paris, France)
1998 Football World Cup (Paris): Opening and Closing Ceremonies
Lisbon World Expo 1998: "AcquaMatrix" Night Show
Abu Dhabi, United Arab Emirates: 25th Anniversary (1996)
Sevilla World Expo 1992: Night Show
Disneyland Resort Paris: Opening Show

Leading permanent and daily shows

"Sahaj Anand": Swaminarayan Akshardham, New Delhi (India) since 2014, still performing as of 2022
"Sat-Chit-Anand": Night Show, Akshardham Temple, Gandhinagar (India) since 2010, still running as of 2022
"Cinescénie," Puy du Fou (France): still running as of 2019
"Songs of the Sea" Night Shows: Sentosa (Singapore), 2007-2014
"Le Mystère de la Note Bleue" Night Shows: Futuroscope (France), 2009-2012
"BraviSeamo" Tokyo Disney Sea (Japan): 2004-2010
Magical Sentosa Night Show: Singapore, 2002-2006
"Le Miroir d'Uranie" Night Show: Futuroscope (France), 2002-2005
"Le Lac aux Images" Night Show: Futuroscope (France), 2000-2002
"Mermaids, Myths and Monsters": SeaWorld Parks in Orlando FL, San Antonio TX and Aurora OH (USA), 1994

Water Screen
Pépin has also been credited with playing a big part in the invention of the water projection screen, a specialized fountain nozzle that directs a large 'fan-spray' of water in the air, on which images from projectors and lasers can be displayed.

Awards
2006 Themed Entertainment Association (TEA) Thea Lifetime Achievement honors – first non-American recipient since the awards were founded in 1994
TEA Thea Award in the Live Event Spectacular category: for "AcquaMatrix" at Lisbon World Expo 1998
TEA Thea Award (2000) in the Live Event Spectacular category: Eiffel Tower Millennium Show, Paris, aka "Millennium Pyro Ballet"; "Year 2000 Starting Signal"
TEA Thea Award (2007) in the Live Event Spectacular category: Toyota Group Pavilion in Aichi World Expo 2005, Japan
Prix FICHE, Best Show for general public: for 1998 Football World Cup Ceremonies
TEA Thea Award (2008) in the Live Event Spectacular category:  for "Songs of the Sea" Night Show in Singapore
ASEAN Best Tourist Attraction in Southeast Asia: for "Songs of the Sea" Night Show in Singapore
Japan Award Special Prize: for new Lexus Launching show  in Tokyo National Theatre
TEA Thea Award (2003) in the Live Event Spectacular category for "Luz y Voces del Tajin," Mexico
Prix FICHE, Best Show for general public: for "KIrara Star Light Fantasy," Yamaguchi Expo 2001, Japan
TiLE Excellence Award: for Globovision system, Swiss Pavilion, Swiss Expo 2002
Prix FICHE, Best Show for large audience: for Eiffel Tower Millennium Show 2000

References

2. An article about Pépin as co-chair of the SATE 2012 Experience Design conference at Disneyland Paris.

3. A write up by Judith Rubin in connection with Pépin receiving the Thea Award for Lifetime Achievement.

4. A 2012 bio of Pépin in connection with his chairing the SATE 2012 Experience Design conference for the Themed Entertainment Association. 

5. 2009 article from attractions industry media outlet Blooloop referencing Pépin as a featured speaker at the annual IAAPA Attractions Expo, the largest trade gathering of the international attractions industry.

6. An article covering Pépin's work at Shanghai Expo 2010.

7. An article about his creative role in the production of the opening and closing ceremonies for the 2008 Olympics in Beijing.

8. Article about the 2000 Eiffel Tower Extravaganza that landed on the covers of Time and Newsweek both and also nabbed a mention in People Magazine.

9. 2007 item in Live Design Online about Pépin and ECA2 in connection with the TEA Thea Award for the Toyota Pavilion at Aichi Expo 2005 world's fair.

10. 2006 item in Lighting&Sound International about Pépin being contracted to produce a spectacular for Sentosa, and being an artistic adviser to the 2008 Beijing Olympic Committee, in company with Steven Spielberg, Zhang Yimou, and Ric Birch.

11. 2006 posting from the Chinese government announcing creative advisers on the 2008 Beijing Olympic team, including Yves Pépin.

12. Item with photo in the Times of India about Yves Pépin and the Akshardam water show.

13. 2009 item in Projection Lighting Staging News about the "Blue Note Mystery" show created by Yves Pépin for Futuroscope Park in Poitiers, France.

14. 2018 article by attractions industry expert Judith Rubin, published by InPark Magazine, about Yves Pépin's career, contributions, background and legacy, with details of noteworthy projects and testimonials from colleagues.

External links
Yves Pépin official website
Getty Images photo and video documentation of Yves Pépin and his work over the years
ECA2 Official Website
Yves Pépin official listing in TEA Member Directory

French artists
Year of birth missing (living people)
Living people
People from Bordeaux